Guo Hao (Chinese: 郭皓; born 14 January 1993) is a Chinese professional football player who currently plays as a midfielder for Chinese Super League side Cangzhou Mighty Lions.

Club career
Guo Hao received organized football training at Locomotive academy. In 2010, he was promoted to Jingtie Locomotive's first team squad for the 2010 China League One. He left Locomotive in the middle of 2010 season and joined Chinese Super League side Tianjin Teda youth team system. Guo was named in the first team squad by Alexandre Guimarães in 2013. He made his senior debut on 10 July 2013 in the fourth round of 2013 Chinese FA Cup against Liaoning Whowin. His Super League debut came on 3 November 2013 in a game against Shanghai Shenxin, coming on as a substitute for Wang Xinxin in the 73rd minute. On 19 July 2015, he scored his first senior goal in a 4–3 home defeat to Guizhou Renhe.

Career statistics 
Statistics accurate as of match played 31 December 2020.

References

External links
 

1993 births
Living people
Chinese footballers
Footballers from Tianjin
Tianjin Jinmen Tiger F.C. players
Chinese Super League players
Footballers at the 2014 Asian Games
Association football midfielders
Asian Games competitors for China